Mbay may refer to:

 Mbay (Indonesia), capital of Nagekeo Regency, Indonesia

 Mbay language, a Bongo–Bagirmi language of Chad and the Central African Republic
 Parfait Anicet Mbay, 2013 foreign minister of the Central African Republic

See also
 Mbaye, a Senegalese given name and family name